Roderick "Rod" Norman is a fictional character from the BBC soap opera EastEnders, played by Christopher McHallem from July 28, 1987, to February 27, 1990. Rod the roadie, is a modern-day hobo. He dosses in squats and never settles anywhere for long, although he does return to Albert Square several times. Rod is a sucker for female hopeless cases and he tries to help out several 'women in need' over the years, although he is rarely thanked for his efforts.

Storylines 
Rod is first seen in Albert Square in July 1987 as an acquaintance of fellow punk, Mary Smith (Linda Davidson). Rod is a greasy loafer, but underneath his scruffy appearance lies a kind-hearted, genuine guy who will go out of his way to help anyone in need. Mary becomes the first lady who Rod takes under his wing. Mary is going through a hard time around the time of his arrival. She has been arrested for solicitation, lost her baby to social services due to neglect, and as well as continuing to prostitute herself, she is using recreational drugs heavily. Seeing how desperate Mary has become, Rod makes it his mission to help her out of the mess she has got herself into. He moves in with her, gets her a job as a cleaner at The Dagmar, weans her off drugs and prostitution, and is instrumental in helping her work towards getting her baby back, who is now in the care of Mary's parents in Stockport. Although there are initial problems (mainly because Mary's parents refuse to give Annie back to her), by the end of the year Mary's father Chris (Allan O'Keefe) arrives in Walford with Annie, and mother and daughter are finally reunited.

Rod really cares for Mary and her baby, but their relationship is always tested due to Mary's selfish and hot-headed nature. Things come to a head in March 1988 when Rod accidentally forgets to pick Annie up from play-group. Mary is furious, and despite all that Rod has done for her, she proceeds in pointing out all his flaws and humiliating him in public by calling him useless and lazy, after which she throws him out of her flat. In the wake of this, a furious Rod disappears from Walford on one of his many road trips. Rod returns a month later and despite Mary's feeble apology, he refuses to move back in with her and starts squatting in an abandoned flat on the Square. Mary takes Rod's rejection badly and after witnessing him with another woman, she starts using drugs again, much to Rod's concern. Mary spends the subsequent months in a downward spiral, and although Rod makes yet another attempt at helping her out, this fails. He washes his hands of her and by May of that year, Mary flees Walford.

Rod remains in Walford, as does Mary's father, who employs Rod as his bookkeeper and organizer of his haulage company and later Rod takes over Barry Clark's (Gary Hailes) market stall. Rod is later forced to act against his principles, when he is threatened by Brad Williams (Jonathan Stratt), a dodgy member of The Firm, and is forced to stitch up local publican Den Watts (Leslie Grantham). The Firm wants Den to take the rap for the torching of The Dagmar, so they coerce Rod into providing false testimony to the police, which implicates Den. Den flees Walford and manages to escape arrest but when The Firm decides they wanted Den dead, Rod is later forced to coerce his whereabouts from Den's best friend Pete Beale (Peter Dean), which leads to his arrest and a spell in prison.

It is around this time when Rod starts to become close to Donna Ludlow (Matilda Ziegler), who has also recently become homeless, and she eventually comes to live with him in his squat. Donna is particularly vindictive and everyone on the Square has washed their hands of her after her malicious games were uncovered. Rod cannot resist a lost cause, and like Mary before her, he tries to get Donna back on the 'straight and narrow'. Donna isn't as receptive as Mary though, and it isn't long before she has managed to get herself addicted to heroin. Rod tries to get Donna off the drug but this only infuriates her, and in order to get revenge for his meddling, she plants heroin on him and then informs the police that he is a dealer. Despite this, Rod continues to try to help Donna, even rescuing her from a vicious gang rape when she turns to prostitution and contacting her adoptive parents to come and sort her out. His efforts are in vain though, and by 1989, Donna has become so depressed and affected by her drug use that she purposefully takes an overdose of heroin and dies. Rod later takes up lodging with Dot Cotton (June Brown). It is here that he becomes involved with yet another hopeless female, Hazel (Virginia Fiol), the girlfriend of Dot's son, Nick (John Altman). Hazel had arrived in Albert Square under the pretense that her baby was Nick's. This later turned out to be a lie and a ploy to extort money from Dot. Dot was devastated to learn she'd been conned, but she came to forgive Hazel and allowed her to live with her, which leads to Hazel and Rod also growing close. When Nick comes back and discovers Hazel's games, he beats her close to death and she spends time in hospital. Whilst there, Rod visits her regularly and he helps wean her off Nick. They subsequently become a couple, but the relationship doesn't last and Rod leaves Walford in February 1990 to follow a hippy trail in India.

External links 

EastEnders characters
Fictional hoboes
Television characters introduced in 1987
Male characters in television
Fictional market stallholders